Ayhan Tuna Üzümcü (born 6 August 1982) is a Turkish football official and a former defender. He is the sporting director of Altay.

Honours 
 Bursaspor
Süper Lig (1): 2009–10

References

External links

1982 births
Footballers from İzmir
Living people
Turkish footballers
Association football defenders
Altay S.K. footballers
Aydınspor footballers
Gençlerbirliği S.K. footballers
Beşiktaş J.K. footballers
Bursaspor footballers
Antalyaspor footballers
Adanaspor footballers
Samsunspor footballers
Denizlispor footballers
Nazilli Belediyespor footballers
Tuzlaspor players
Süper Lig players
TFF First League players
TFF Second League players